Artful Dodger is a character from the 1838 Charles Dickens novel Oliver Twist.

Artful Dodger may also refer to:

Music
Artful Dodger (U.S. band), a power pop/rock band
Artful Dodger (duo), a UK garage duo
The Artful Dodger (album) or the title song, by Ian Hunter, 1996
The Artful Dodger, music producer for Australian independent record label Playback 808

Television
The Artful Dodger (TV series), a 1959 British sitcom
"The Artful Dodger" (NCIS), a television episode
"The Artful Dodger!" (The Raccoons), a television episode

Other uses
Artful Dodger, a clothing brand owned by Jay-Z and Iconix Brand Group
Condredge Holloway (born 1954), American former gridiron football quarterback nicknamed the "Artful Dodger"